All In was a concert residency by Puerto Rican singer Ricky Martin.

Set list
"Livin' la Vida Loca"
"This Is Good"
"Shake Your Bon-Bon"
"Luck Be a Lady / The Lady Is a Tramp"
"It's Alright"
"Private Emotion"
"She's All I Ever Had"
"Drop It on Me"
"Lola, Lola"
"Vente Pa' Ca"
"La Bomba"
"She Bangs"
"Loaded"
"Nobody Wants to Be Lonely"
"Vuelve"
"Pégate"
"La Mordidita"
"Por Arriba, Por Abajo"
"María"
"The Cup of Life"

Shows

References

External links
Martin's official website

Concert residencies in the Las Vegas Valley
2017 concert residencies
2018 concert residencies
Park MGM